Berto Poosen (27 February 1944 – 26 February 2012) was a Belgian volleyball player. He competed at the 1968 Summer Olympics.

References

External links
 

1944 births
2012 deaths
Belgian men's volleyball players
Olympic volleyball players of Belgium
Volleyball players at the 1968 Summer Olympics
People from Riemst
Sportspeople from Limburg (Belgium)
20th-century Belgian people